Our Lady of Africa may refer to:
 Notre Dame d'Afrique, a basilica in Algeria
 Shrine of Our Lady of Africa, in the Spanish exclave of Ceuta in North Africa

See also
 Our Mother of Africa Chapel, Washington, D.C.
 Titles of Mary